Himbacine is an alkaloid isolated from the bark of Australian magnolias. Himbacine has been synthesized using a Diels-Alder reaction as a key step. Himbacine's activity as a muscarinic receptor antagonist, with specificity for the muscarinic acetylcholine receptor M2, made it a promising starting point in Alzheimer's disease research.  The development of a muscarinic antagonist based on himbacine failed but an analog, vorapaxar, has been approved by the FDA as a thrombin receptor antagonist.

References 

Muscarinic antagonists
Naphthofurans
Piperidine alkaloids
Lactones